Peter Malcolm (born April 3, 1994) is an American rugby union player who plays hooker for the Seattle Seawolves in Major League Rugby (MLR) and the United States men's national team.

Malcolm previously played for the Ohio Aviators in the short-lived PRO Rugby, the San Diego Legion and the Austin Elite in the MLR. Malcolm also played for the USA Eagles- #505, USA Falcons - developmental side for the United States men's national rugby sevens team.

Early life
Malcolm attended Stoneman Douglas High School in Parkland, Florida, where he played both football and rugby. He was named a USA Rugby High School All American each of his four years in high school. After graduating from Stoneman Douglas, he attended Wheeling Jesuit University where he continued to play rugby and was named a Collegiate All American. In 2017, Malcolm moved to Austin, Texas, where he played for the Austin Huns. The Huns won the 2017 National Championship, with Malcolm scoring a try in the championship final against New York Athletic Club.

Club career

Ohio Aviators
Malcolm played for the Ohio Aviators in PRO Rugby's first and only season in 2016. Malcolm made his debut for the Aviators on May 1, starting in the Aviators' 51–17 victory over San Francisco. He scored his first (and only) try for the Aviators on June 26, in the Aviators' 71–20 victory over San Francisco.

Austin Elite
Malcolm joined the Austin Elite for their inaugural season in 2018. He was the first player to be signed by the Major League Rugby club. Malcolm missed the entire 2018 season after sustaining a torn ACL.

International career

USA Falcons
Malcolm competed for the USA Falcons, the developmental side for the United States men's national rugby sevens team, at the Halloween 7s Elite Invitational Tournament that was held on October 31 and November 1, 2015.

USA Junior All-Americans
Malcolm made his debut in international play with the United States men's national under-20 team (Junior All-Americans) in 2014 and played at the 2014 Junior World Rugby Trophy, making a start at number eight.

USA Collegiate All-Americans
Malcolm served as captain of the Men's Collegiate All-Americans in a September 16, 2017 match against Oxford University.

USA Selects
Malcolm was selected to represent the United States in the Selects' appearance in the 2017 World Rugby Americas Pacific Challenge (APC). He was named the team's captain by Head Coach Scott Lawrence. He scored his first try for the Selects in a 48–26 defeat to Samoa. He also started in 2017 APC victories over Uruguay and Canada.

USA Eagles
Malcolm made his debut with the USA Eagles on February 4, 2017, starting in the Eagles' 29–23 victory over Uruguay in the 2017 Americas Rugby Championship. Malcolm scored his first two tries for the Eagles in the Eagles' 57–9 victory over Chile on February 25, 2017.

References

1994 births
Living people
American rugby union players
United States international rugby union players
Rugby union hookers
Austin Gilgronis players
Ohio Aviators players
San Diego Legion players
Seattle Seawolves players